The 2008 Malawi census was the fifth national census in Malawi, which took place on 8-28 July 2008. The population of Malawi was counted as 13,077,160 – an increase of 3,143,292 (31.64%) over the 1998 census.

Preliminary results from the 2008 census were released to the public in November 2008 and final results in November 2009, from the National Statistical Office of Malawi website. The next Malawian census was held on 3-23 September 2018.

Projections
The 2008 projected population of Malawi was 13,630,164 based on the medium variant of projections based on the 1998 census.
The actual enumerated population was 13,077,160 which was about 96% the size of the 2008 projection.

Results

Population and dwellings
Population counts for regions of Malawi. All figures are for the census de facto population count. The de jure results showed a population of 13,029,498.

 Resident population count was 13,077,160 up 3,143,292 from the 1998 Census.
 There are 6,358,933 males in Malawi (48.63% of the population) and 6,718,227 females (51.37% of the population).
 On average, the population grew by around 2.8% per year since the 1998 Census – significantly higher than the annual average growth between 1987 and 1998, which was 2.0%.

Birthplace
In 2008, 13,025,606 people (99.61%) were born in Malawi, with 51,554 (0.39%) born abroad.

Religion 
According to the 2008 Census, 82.7% of the population identified as being Christian, 13% as Muslim, 2.5% identified as having no religion, and 1.9% had other religions.

References

Malawi